The North Carolina General Assembly of 1862–1864 met in Raleigh from November 17, 1862 to December 22, 1862.   Extra sessions were held on January 19, 1863–February 12, 1863; June 30, 1863–July 7, 1863; November 23, 1863–December 14, 1863; and May 17–30 1864 .  The assembly consisted of the 120 members of the North Carolina House of Commons from 82 counties and 50 senators representing one or more counties in North Carolina Senate elected by the voters in October 1862.  Zebulon Baird Vance was Governor of North Carolina during this assembly.  This assembly met during the American Civil War as part of the Confederate States of America.  Much of the legislation passed by this assembly dealt with the managing the state and its population during wartime.

Assembly membership

House of Commons members

There were 82 counties with 120 delegates, 5 counties with three delegates, 28 counties with two delegates, and 49 counties with one delegate.  The House of Commons delegates elected a Speaker (Richard Spaight Donnell, Robert B. Gilliam, Marmaduke Swain Robins, William E. Mann), Clerk, Assistant Clerk, Doorkeeper, and Assistant Doorkeeper.  The following delegates to the House of Commons were elected by the voters of North Carolina to represent each county and district:

Senate members

The Senators elected a President, Clerk, Assistant Clerk, Doorkeeper, and Assistant Doorkeeper.  The following Senators were elected by the voters of North Carolina to represent each county:

Legislation
The Civil War was ongoing during the entire term of this assembly.  The assembly passed public laws dealing with the following: the destroyed court house in Hertford County, funding of the state insane asylum (Dorothea Dix Hospital), establishing the eighth judicial district, prohibiting the distillation of spirituous liquors, modifying acts so that justices of the peace absent from counties under occupation of Union troops would not lose their position, acts dealing with the state militia, purchase and hiding of emergency provisions, authorization to the governor for the use of slave labor for building fortifications, provisions to survivors of soldiers dying in service, resolution to declare the separation of the  United States and Confederate State final, creating a Roll of Honor maintained by the Governor of Confederate soldiers and patriots from North Carolina, a resolution condemning the confiscation of North Carolina government iron by the Confederate Government, extending the statute of limitations till the war is over, allowing the governor to draft all able bodied men between 18 and 45 years old into the militia, making monopolies, extortions, and speculation illegal during the war, and raising wartime taxes. The senate and house occasionally went into secret sessions, according to the minutes. This General Assembly created the Office of the North Carolina State Auditor, who was initially elected by the legislature every two years. Samuel F. Phillips was elected by this legislature as the first auditor. For details about legislation and minutes of this assembly, see Legislative Documents.

Notes

References

1862
General Assembly
 1862
 1862
North Carolina in the American Civil War
1863 in North Carolina
1862 U.S. legislative sessions
1863 U.S. legislative sessions